National Route 5 is a national highway in South Korea connects Tongyeong to Jaseong. Due to the separation of Korean peninsula, it de facto ends in Cheorwon by now. It established on 31 August 1971.

Main stopovers

South Korea section
South Gyeongsang Province
 Geoje - Changwon - Haman County - Changnyeong County
Daegu
 Dalseong County - Dalseo District - Nam District - Dalseo District - Seo District - Buk District
North Gyeongsang Province
 Chilgok County - Gunwi County - Uiseong County - Andong - Yeongju
North Chungcheong Province
 Danyang County - Jecheon
Gangwon Province
 Wonju - Hoengseong County - Hongcheon County - Chuncheon - Hwacheon County - Cheorwon County

North Korea section
Kangwon Province
 Pyonggang County
South Hamgyong Province
 Anbyon County - Wonsan - Munchon - Kowon County - Kumya - Hamhung - Changjin County
North Pyongan Province
 Kimhyongjik County - Chasong County

Major intersections

 (■): Motorway
IS: Intersection, IC: Interchange

South Gyeongsang Province

Daegu

North Gyeongsang Province

North Chungcheong Province

Gangwon Province

References

5
Roads in South Gyeongsang
Roads in Daegu
Roads in North Gyeongsang
Roads in North Chungcheong
Roads in Gangwon